Froland is a municipality in Agder county, Norway. It is part of the traditional region of Sørlandet. The administrative center is the village of Blakstad, which along with Osedalen form the main population center of the municipality. Other villages in Froland include Bøylefoss, Bøylestad, Froland, Frolands verk, Heldalsmo, Hinnebu, Hynnekleiv, Jomås, Lauvrak, Libru, Løvjomås, Mjåvatn, Mjølhus, Mykland, and Risdal.

The  municipality is the 176th largest by area out of the 356 municipalities in Norway. Froland is the 156th most populous municipality in Norway with a population of 6,098.

General information

The municipality of Froland was established when it was separated from the municipality of Øyestad in 1850. The new municipality had an initial population of 1,976. During the 1960s, there were many municipal mergers across Norway due to the work of the Schei Committee. On 1 January 1967, the neighboring municipality of Mykland (population: 604) was merged into the municipality of Froland. The newly enlarged municipality had a population of 3,372. On 1 January 1968, the Flateland area of neighboring Åmli municipality (population: 6) was transferred to Froland.

On 1 January 1970, the two uninhabited areas of Neset and Råbudal were separated from Froland and transferred to neighboring Birkenes municipality. Then on 1 January 1979, the uninhabited Landheia area was transferred from Froland to Birkenes municipality. On 1 January 1991, the Dalen area in Birkenes municipality (population: 60) was transferred from Birkenes to Froland municipality.

Name
The municipality (originally the parish) is named after the old Froland farm, since the first Froland Church was built there. The first element is the genitive case of the male name Fróði and the last element is land which means "land" or "farm".

Coat of arms
The coat of arms was granted on 17 January 1986. The official blazon is "Vert, a squirrel sejant erect argent". This means the arms have a green field (background) and the charge is a squirrel sitting on its haunches with its front paws raised. The squirrel has a tincture of argent which means it is commonly colored white, but if it is made out of metal, then silver is used. The green color in the field and the squirrel was chosen as a symbol for the forests and wildlife in the municipality. The arms were designed by David Rike.

Churches
The Church of Norway has one parish within the municipality of Froland. It is part of the Arendal prosti (deanery) in the Diocese of Agder og Telemark.

History
The iron production facility, Frolands verk, was founded in 1763 and continued in production through 1867. After that the facility became a sawmill. Today the main building from 1791 is a historically protected building, and the old stables are used as a cultural center.

Geography
The municipality is bordered on the north by the municipality of Åmli; on the east by Tvedestrand; on the south by Arendal, Grimstad, and Birkenes; and on the west by Evje og Hornnes and Bygland.

The large rivers Nidelva and Tovdalselva both run through Froland. There are also many lakes in Froland, including Homstølvatnet, Nelaug, Nystølfjorden, and Uldalsåna.

Government
All municipalities in Norway, including Froland, are responsible for primary education (through 10th grade), outpatient health services, senior citizen services, unemployment and other social services, zoning, economic development, and municipal roads. The municipality is governed by a municipal council of elected representatives, which in turn elect a mayor.  The municipality falls under the Agder District Court and the Agder Court of Appeal.

Municipal council
The municipal council of Froland is made up of 19 representatives that are elected to four year terms. Currently, the party breakdown is as follows:

Transportation
The Arendalsbanen railway which runs from Nelaug to Arendal connects Froland and Arendal to the railway system in Norway. Blakstad Station is in the municipal centre of Blakstad, Froland Station is located in the village of Froland, and Bøylestad Station is in the village of Bøylestad.

There are also several highways in Froland including the Norwegian National Road 41, Norwegian County Road 408, and Norwegian County Road 413.

Media
The newspaper Frolendingen is published in Froland.

Notable residents
 Niels Henrik Abel (1802 – 1829 in Froland) a distinguished Norwegian mathematician, buried at Froland cemetery 
 Iver Steen Thomle (1812 in Froland – 1889) a jurist and Chief Justice of the Supreme Court of Norway 1878–86
 Gotfred Kvifte (1914 in Froland – 1997) a Norwegian physicist and academic
 Marte Olsbu Røiseland (born 1990) a biathlete, triple gold medalist at the 2022 Winter Olympics and team silver medalist at the 2018 Winter Olympics, resides in Froland.

References

External links

Municipal fact sheet from Statistics Norway 

Arendals fossekompani 
Froland.org 
Municipal website 
Froland Curlingklubb 

 
Municipalities of Agder
1850 establishments in Norway